The cash method of accounting, also known as cash-basis accounting, cash receipts and disbursements method of accounting or cash accounting (the EU VAT directive vocabulary Article 226) records revenue when cash is received, and expenses when they are paid in cash. As a basis of accounting, this is in contrast to the alternative accrual method which records income items when they are earned and records deductions when expenses are incurred regardless of the flow of cash.

Cash method of accounting in the United States (GAAP)

Use in contract accounting
The cash method of accounting has historically been one of the four methods of recognizing revenues and profits on contracts, the other ones being the accrual method, the completed-contract method and the percentage-of-completion methods. Since the approval by Congress of the Tax Reform Act of 1986, the cash method could not longer be used for C corporations, partnerships in which one or more partners are C Corporations, tax shelters, and certain types of trusts.

Because of 1986 regulation, in general, construction businesses do not use the cash method of accounting. Some construction businesses use the cash method; and there are many other companies that use a modified form of the cash method, which is acceptable under federal income-tax regulations. Under the modified Cash method of accounting, most income and expenses are determined under cash receipts and disbursements, but purchase of equipment and of items whose benefit will cover more than one year is to be capitalized, whereas such items as depreciation and amortization are charged to cost.

Use in other types of businesses
The cash method of accounting is also used by other types of businesses, such as farming businesses, qualified personal business corporations and entities with average gross receipts of $5,000,000 or less for the last three fiscal years.

Advantages for tax planning and IRS stand
There are certain advantages in tax planning when the cash method of accounting is used: for instance, payment of business expenses may be accelerated before year end, in order to maximize tax deductions, whereas billings for services may be postponed to after year end, so that payments won't be received until the new year, thus postponing tax payments on such income. Because of these advantages and the manipulations that can occur with it in order to minimize taxable income, the IRS has discouraged (although not prohibited entirely) the cash basis of accounting for tax purposes. For instance, companies that use the cash basis of accounting may not report any inventory in their financial statements, in fact reporting of any inventory at year end can lead to manipulation of taxable income to an enormous extent.

Cash method of accounting according to IFRS
While the standard accounting methods commonly used in first world countries such as the United States are more than adequate for the appropriate times and eras dependent upon the incumbents of the agencies which patrol the financial statements and account balances of both mom and pop shops and multinational conglomerates, it is become increasingly obvious in more recent years that the international standard(s) of accounting found in IFRS and the field of forensic accounting itself benefit greatly due to the advantages found in the cash method of accounting according to IFRS.

For example,

"Imagine you purchase a car for $20,000 in 2015, but under a special promotion no payments are due on your bill until 2018. In what year did you incur the $20,000 bill? Most people would say 2015, the year you acquired the car. That’s the answer mandated under accrual accounting, a method of financial reporting required of all public companies by the Financial Accounting Standards Board. But many state and city legislatures disagree. They operate with the conviction that a bill is not incurred until the money leaves your bank account to pay it. So if you choose not to pay the bill for your car until 2018, for accounting purposes the bill will only appear that year."

References

Accounting systems
Cash